Rayavaram is a village and a Mandal in Konaseema district in the state of Andhra Pradesh in India.

Villages
Chelluru             
Kurakallapalle    
Kurmapuram    
Lolla    
Machavaram   
Nadurubada    
Pasalapudi  
Rayavaram    
Someswaram   
V.savaram   
Vedurupaka  
Venturu

References 

Villages in East Godavari district